Statistics of Football Clubs Association Championship in the 1923–24 season.

Athens Football Clubs Association

*Known results only.

The match took place on 8 June 1924 at Leoforos Alexandras Stadium.

|+Final Round

|}

Apollon Athens won the championship.

Athens-Piraeus Football Clubs Association

Macedonia Football Clubs Association

External links
Rsssf 1923–24 championship

 

Panhellenic Championship seasons
1923 in association football
1924 in association football
1923–24 in Greek football